Scott Patrick McHenry (born May 25, 1987) is a professional Canadian football slotback who is currently a free agent. He was drafted by the Calgary Stampeders in the fourth round of the 2009 CFL Draft. He played CIS football for the Saskatchewan Huskies football team.  He was signed in the 2010 offseason by the Winnipeg Blue Bombers, but was cut by the Bombers on June 23, 2010. Soon after, he signed a practice roster agreement with the Saskatchewan Roughriders on June 25, 2010. He was taken off the Roughriders' practice roster and signed to the Blue Bombers active roster on August 5, 2010
 He was later released by the Blue Bombers on August 29, 2011. He was quickly signed to a practice roster agreement with the Roughriders on August 31, 2011.

References

External links
Saskatchewan Roughriders bio 
Saskatchewan Huskies bio

1987 births
Calgary Stampeders players
Canadian football slotbacks
Living people
Sportspeople from Saskatoon
Players of Canadian football from Saskatchewan
Saskatchewan Huskies football players
Saskatchewan Roughriders players
Winnipeg Blue Bombers players